Paradise Honors High School is a high school in Surprise, Arizona. It is operated by Paradise Education Centers, an Arizona Honors holder that also runs an elementary and middle school.

References

External links 
 

Public high schools in Arizona
Charter schools in Arizona
Schools in Maricopa County, Arizona